Netherton railway station served the village of Netherton, Kirklees, England, from 1869 to 1949 on the Meltham branch line.

History
The station was opened on 5 July 1869 on the Lancashire and Yorkshire Railway. It closed on 23 May 1949.

References 

Disused railway stations in West Yorkshire
Former Lancashire and Yorkshire Railway stations
Railway stations in Great Britain opened in 1869
Railway stations in Great Britain closed in 1949
1869 establishments in England
1949 disestablishments in England